Mazhavilkavadi is a 1989 Indian Malayalam-language comedy drama film directed by Sathyan Anthikad and written by Raghunath Paleri. It stars Jayaram, Sithara, Krishnankutty Nair, Urvashi, Innocent in the lead roles. This is one of the very few films where Innocent plays a negative role.
It won four Kerala State Film Awards that year, the awards for Best Actress (Urvashi), Best Supporting Actor (Innocent), Best Music Director (Johnson), and Best Singer (K. S. Chithra). 

The film was remade in Tamil as Subramaniya Swamy with Pandiarajan.

Plot
Velayudhankutty (Jayaram) is in love with his cousin Amminikutty (Sithara), but her father Kalarickel Kizhamkamthudiyil Shankarankutty Menon (Innocent) opposes to it. Furthermore, Shankarankutty Menon suffers from a compulsive obsession to assault those who do not obey him. To make money, Velayudhankutty goes to Palani, to find a  man named Kunjikhader (Mamukkoya) to help after, who claims to be the supervisor of a leather factory, after being told by his father Nanukuttan (Karamana Janardhanan Nair). After searching for a few days at Palani with the help of a horse-cart driver Murukan (Bobby Kottarakkara), he finds that Kunjikhader is a pickpocket currently in prison, and claims to be the supervisor of a leather factory because he has many stolen leather purses. Kunjikadher comes out of jail by fooling the police, claiming to be going to Madurai. Velayudhankutty steals a bag from a Tamil barber (Krishnankutty Nair) and starts his own business as a barber. The barber's daughter falls in love with him. Meanwhile, Kunjikhader causes chaos in Velayudhankutty's village by pickpocketing. Kunjikhader and his associates kidnap Amminikutty to take her to Palani, but none of them know how to drive a car, and they end up with the police. Velayudhankutty lies to Amminikutty about being employed in the leather factory claimed by Kunjikhader. When Shankarankutty Menon refuses to their marriage again, Amminikutty attempts suicide, but is saved. Later, Shankarankutty Menon's family arrive in Palani, and find the truth. However, in the end Velayudhankutty marries Amminikutty.

Cast

 Jayaram  as Panadaravalappil Velayudhankutty
 Sithara as Amminikutty
 Urvashi as Anandavalli
 Krishnan Kutty Nair as Kaleeswaran Kavalayil Kali Muthu
 Valsala Menon as Bhairavi
 Innocent as Kalarickel Kizhakamthudiyil Shankarankutty Menon
 Meena as Nangeli
 Karamana Janardanan Nair as Nanukuttan
 Kaviyoor Ponnamma as Velayudhankutty's mother
 Sreeja as Vilasini
 Philomina  as Velayudhankutty's grandmother
 Mammukkoya as Kunjikhader
 Bobby Kottarakkara as Murukan
 Paravoor Bharathan as Vasu
 Oduvil Unnikrishnan as Kunjappu
 Jagannathan as Ubaid
 Sankaradi as Kuriya Varkey

Soundtrack 
The film had musical score composed by Johnson.

Awards
 Kerala State Film Awards
 Best Actress - Urvashi
 Best Supporting Actor - Innocent
 Best Music Director - Johnson
 Best Singer - K. S. Chithra

Box office
The film was a commercial success.

References

External links
 
 Mazhavilkavadi at the Malayalam Movie Database
  Mazhavilkavadi at Metromatinee.com
 Mazhavilkavadi at Oneindia.in

1980s Malayalam-language films
1980s romantic comedy-drama films
Indian romantic comedy-drama films
1989 films
Films scored by Johnson
Films directed by Sathyan Anthikad
Malayalam films remade in other languages
1989 comedy films
1989 drama films
Films shot in Palani
Films shot in Palakkad